XChange (also spelled: Xchange and X Change) is a 2000 Canadian science fiction thriller film directed by Allan Moyle and starring Stephen Baldwin, Kyle MacLachlan, Kim Coates, Pascale Bussières, and Janet Kidder.

Plot
In the future, where it's faster to travel by exchanging bodies with someone at the destination, a man's body is hijacked by a ruthless terrorist.

Toffler (Kim Coates), a member of the privileged "Corpie" (corporate) class, accidentally ends up in the body of a terrorist named Fisk (Kyle MacLachlan), who has in turn taken over Toffler's original body. Unable to continue as Fisk, Toffler is forced to use a cloned body (Stephen Baldwin) with a limited lifespan, in order to track down Fisk and get his original body back.

External links
 
 

2000 films
English-language Canadian films
2000s English-language films
Canadian science fiction thriller films
2000s science fiction thriller films
Films directed by Allan Moyle
Films scored by Andrew Lockington
Body swapping in films
2000s Canadian films